In mathematics, a tower of fields is a sequence of field extensions

The name comes from such sequences often being written in the form

A tower of fields may be finite or infinite.

Examples
 is a finite tower with rational, real and complex numbers.
The sequence obtained by letting F0 be the rational numbers Q, and letting

(i.e. Fn+1 is obtained from Fn by adjoining a 2n&hairsp;th root of 2) is an infinite tower.
If p is a prime number the p&hairsp;th cyclotomic tower of Q is obtained by letting F0 = Q and Fn be the field obtained by adjoining to Q the pn&hairsp;th roots of unity. This tower is of fundamental importance in Iwasawa theory.
The Golod–Shafarevich theorem shows that there are infinite towers obtained by iterating the Hilbert class field construction to a number field.

References
Section 4.1.4 of 

Field extensions